Chennai Park railway station (or just Park station) is one of the railway stations in Chennai, India, on the Chennai Beach–Chengelpet section of the Chennai Suburban Railway Network. It serves the neighbourhood of Park Town, a suburb of Chennai. It is located at about 3 km from Chennai Beach terminus and is situated on Poonamallee High Road, across Chennai Central railway station. It has an elevation of 7 m above sea level.

History

The station lies in the Chennai Beach–Tambaram section of the Chennai Suburban Railway Network, the first suburban section of the city. With the completion of track-lying work in March 1931, which began in 1928, the suburban services were started on 11 May 1931 between Beach and Tambaram, and was electrified on 15 November 1931, with the first MG EMU services running on 1.5 kV DC. The section was converted to 25 kV AC traction on 15 January 1967.

Traffic
As of 2012, the station handles about 440,000 passengers a day.

See also

 Chennai Suburban Railway
 Railway stations in Chennai

References

External links
 Chennai Park railway station on IndiaRailInfo.com
 Local Train timings from/to Chennai Park

Stations of Chennai Suburban Railway
Railway stations in Chennai
Railway stations opened in 1931